Podolkhovsky is a rural locality (a khutor) in Zimnyatskoye Rural Settlement, Serafimovichsky District, Volgograd Oblast, Russia. The population was 127 as of 2010. There are 4 streets.

Geography 
Podolkhovsky is located in forest, 15 km northeast of Serafimovich (the district's administrative centre) by road. Pichugin is the nearest rural locality.

References 

Rural localities in Serafimovichsky District